Pipeline vaccine refers to vaccines which are under development. The World Health Organization's (WHO) Product Development for Vaccines Advisory Committee oversees the development of pipeline vaccines.

Examples
The WHO updates a list of diseases for which vaccine development is in pipeline. As of July 2021, the pipeline vaccines for the following diseases are under development.
 Campylobacter jejuni
 Chagas Disease
 Chikungunya
 Enterotoxigenic Escherichia coli
 Enterovirus 71 (EV71)
 Group B Streptococcus (GBS)
 Herpes Simplex Virus
 HIV-1
 Human Hookworm Disease
 Leishmaniasis
 Malaria
 Neisseria gonorrhoeae
 Nipah virus infection
 Nontyphoidal Salmonella Disease
 Norovirus
 Paratyphoid fever
 Respiratory Syncytial Virus (RSV)
 Schistosomiasis
 Shigella
 Staphylococcus aureus
 Streptococcus pneumoniae
 Streptococcus pyrogenes
 Tuberculosis
 Universal Influenza Vaccine

References

Vaccines